Braidwood is a surname. Notable people with the surname include:

Adam Braidwood (born 1984), Canadian football player
Chuck Braidwood (1903–1945), American football player
Ernie Braidwood (1895–1968), English footballer
James Braidwood (firefighter) (1800–1861), Scottish firefighter
Linda Braidwood (1909–2003), American archaeologist
Phil Braidwood (born 1949), Manx politician
Robert John Braidwood (1907-2003), American archaeologist and anthropologist
Thomas Braidwood (1715–1806), founder of a school for the deaf in Scotland
Thomas Braidwood Wilson (1792–1843), Australian surgeon and explorer
Tom Braidwood (born 1948), Canadian actor